The Marymount Colleges are a group of colleges founded by the Religious of the Sacred Heart of Mary (RSHM), an institute with French origins which was founded on February 24, 1849.  When the institution expanded to the United States, its members founded a series of parochial schools, called the RSHM Network of Schools, with the name "Marymount".

United States

New York
Of the American colleges founded by RSHM, Marymount College, Tarrytown, was founded first, on December 8, 1907, founded by Johanna Butler. Marymount School, a women's Catholic high school in Manhattan, was founded in 1926.  In 1936, an extension of Marymount College, Tarrytown, was formed in Manhattan.  It later became the co-educational college now known as Marymount Manhattan College.

The original Marymount College, Tarrytown, was consolidated with Fordham University. In fall 2005, Fordham University announced that it would close the college in June 2007. Thus, the last graduating Marymount class was the Class of 2007. In August 2007, Fordham announced, to the disappointment of many alumnae, that it would sell the Marymount campus. The University indicated that the unjustifiable and disproportionate cost of campus maintenance was the reason for closure, and that the University had already expended more on the maintenance and repair of the campus than it was even likely to recoup from its sale. On February 17, 2008, Fordham announced the sale of the campus for $27 million to EF Education, a chain of private language-instruction schools.

California
In 1923, Marymount School of Los Angeles was founded. An extension site was founded at Palos Verdes, which exists to this day as Marymount California University. Other California schools were established at Santa Barbara, Studio City, Montebello and San Jose. The four year tract of Marymount College of Los Angeles merged with the Jesuit Loyola University in 1973 and currently exists as Loyola Marymount University. Marymount High School in Los Angeles also traces its roots to the Marymount School of Los Angeles

Virginia
In 1950, Marymount College of Virginia was founded in Arlington.  The College became co-educational in 1972 and gained its University status in 1986. It currently exists as Marymount University.

Florida
In 1962, Marymount College of Boca Raton was founded. By 1971, the college had entered a transitional period; in 1974, Marymount College of Boca Raton became the College of Boca Raton. The college gained university standing under the name Lynn University in 1991.

Other
Other secondary schools and junior colleges were founded in Ferguson and Florissant, Missouri, and Rolling Meadows, Illinois.

Colombia
There are three Marymount Schools in Colombia located in the cities of Medellin, Bogota and Barranquilla. Marymount School (Colegio Marymount or Fundación Nuevo Marymount) is located in Bogota and is considered amongst the best schools in the city. It is a bilingual and Catholic school that seeks to provide an integral education for women. It has offered the International Baccalaureate since 2007.

France
Marymount School in Paris, France, is the oldest international school in Paris and is part of the Religious of the Sacred Heart of Mary network of Marymount schools.

The history of Marymount Paris can be traced back to 1846 when Father Jean Gailhac founded an order of Sisters in Béziers in the south of France. The objective, considered a progressive idea at that time, was the education of young women. Schools eventually opened in Portugal, England, Ireland and the United States.

Italy
Marymount International School Rome is a private Catholic co-educational school catering to students from Early Childhood (age 3) to Grade 12 located in Rome, Italy. It operates on the American school system but also offers the International Baccalaureate diploma program  for its Grade 11 and Grade 12 students, as well as the Italian Esami di Stato (state exams) for the Terza Media (8th grade). 

It is considered one of the best international schools in Italy. Most students later attend top world-class universities such as Brown University, Bocconi University,       University of Rome I "La Sapienza", Cornell University, Harvard University, London School of Economics and Political Science, New York University.

Mexico
Colégio Marymount, Cuernavaca was founded in 1957. It is one of the biggest schools in the city and has one of the best campuses in the state of Morelos.

Canada

Quebec 
There was a Marymount school in the City of Québec from the early 1950s to 1969, initially located on Mont Carmel street in Old Quebec, moving to its own large campus St. Foy.

United Kingdom
Marymount International School in London was founded in 1955.

References

External links
 Marymount, Cuernavaca- Official website
 Marymount, London - Official website
 Colegio Marymount, Bogotá - Official website

Catholic universities and colleges in the United States